The 2014 Lale Cup was a professional tennis tournament played on outdoor hard courts. It was the second edition of the tournament and part of the 2014 ITF Women's Circuit, offering a total of $50,000 in prize money. It took place in Istanbul, Turkey, on 21–27 April 2014.

Singles main draw entrants

Seeds 

 1 Rankings as of 14 April 2014

Other entrants 
The following players received wildcards into the singles main draw:
  Ayla Aksu
  Hülya Esen
  İnci Öğüt
  İpek Soylu

The following players received entry from the qualifying draw:
  Nicoleta-Cătălina Dascălu
  Ximena Hermoso
  Zuzana Luknárová
  Iryna Shymanovich

The following player received entry into the singles main draw as a lucky loser:
  Michaela Boev

The following players received entry with a protected ranking:
  Vitalia Diatchenko

The following player received entry with a junior exempt:
  Barbora Krejčíková

Champions

Singles 

  Denisa Allertová def.  Yuliya Beygelzimer 6–2, 6–3

Doubles 

  Petra Krejsová /  Tereza Smitková def.  Michaëlla Krajicek /  Aleksandra Krunić 1–6, 7–6(7–2), [11–9]

External links 
 2014 Lale Cup at ITFtennis.com

2014 ITF Women's Circuit
2014
2014 in Turkish tennis
2014 in Turkish women's sport